Tieshan Township is a township in Guangxin District, Shangrao, Jiangxi, China. , it administers the following five villages:
Tieshan Village
Xiyan Village
Jiushi She Ethnic Village
Xiaoxi Village
Daxi Village

References 

Township-level divisions of Jiangxi
Shangrao